Rihi Puhiwahine Te Rangi-hirawea (c. 1816 - 18 February 1906) was a New Zealand composer of waiata. Of Māori descent, she identified with the Ngati Maniapoto and Ngati Tuwharetoa iwi. She was born in Taringamotu River, King Country, New Zealand.

References

1906 deaths
19th-century New Zealand women singers
21st-century New Zealand women singers
New Zealand composers
Ngāti Tūwharetoa people
Ngāti Maniapoto people
Year of birth uncertain